Amer Said Al-Shatri (born 5 April 1990) is an Omani international footballer who plays as a midfielder for Omani club Mirbat.

Club career
He previously played for Salalah-based club Al-Nasr. On 16 July 2013, he signed a contract with rivals Dhofar.

International career
Amer was selected for Oman for the first time in 2010. He made his first appearance for Oman on 11 August 2010 in a friendly match against Kazakhstan.

Honours

Club
With Dhofar
Baniyas SC International Tournament: Winner 2014

References

External links

1990 births
Living people
Omani footballers
People from Muscat, Oman
Association football midfielders
Al-Nasr SC (Salalah) players
Al-Orouba SC players
Dhofar Club players
Oman Professional League players
Oman international footballers
Footballers at the 2010 Asian Games
Asian Games competitors for Oman
2015 AFC Asian Cup players